Donald J. Sobol (October 4, 1924 – July 11, 2012) was an American writer best known for his children's books, especially the Encyclopedia Brown mystery series.

Early life and education
Donald Sobol was born in The Bronx, New York City, New York,  to Ira J. and Ida (Gelula) Sobol. Ira Sobol owned a few gas stations that eventually were sold. Donald attended the NYC Ethical Culture Fieldston School and then served for two years during World War II with the Army Corps of Engineers in the Pacific Theatre. After the War Sobol graduated from Oberlin College with a degree in English literature in 1948.

Career
Sobol's career began as a copy boy for the New York Sun, and he eventually worked his way up to reporter. In 1949, he started work at the Daily News and remained there for two years. After a brief stint as a buyer at Macy's in New York, he moved to Florida and started writing full-time.

He started writing the syndicated series Two-Minute Mysteries in 1959, starring criminologist Dr. Haledjian. It proved very popular and ran for more than ten years. In 1963, he started writing the Encyclopedia Brown series, featuring Leroy "Encyclopedia" Brown, a schoolboy who was an amateur sleuth. Compared with the Two-Minute Mysteries series, which features crimes as serious as murder, the Encyclopedia Brown books are more juvenile-oriented, often dealing with matters such as pranks or petty theft.  Sobol's Encyclopedia Brown titles have never been out of print and have been translated into twelve languages. Sobol was rejected two dozen times before his first Encyclopedia Brown book was published.

In 1975, the Mystery Writers of America honored Sobol and his Encyclopedia Brown series with a Special Edgar Award. The last book in the series penned by Sobol, Encyclopedia Brown and the Case of the Soccer Scheme, was published in October 2012, three months after the author's death.

Sobol wrote the children's novel Secret Agents Four, in which a group of Miami teenagers attempt to thwart foreign saboteurs.  Sobol also penned the non-fiction book True Sea Adventures, published in 1975.

Sobol wrote more than 65 books. In addition to the books he wrote for children, Sobol also wrote a number of nonfiction books on topics ranging from US civil war history to investing. He also wrote and contributed to magazines under a variety of pen names. His manuscripts are stored at the University of Minnesota, in the Kerlan Collection.

Personal life and final years
Sobol was married to Rose (née Tiplitz) who was both an engineer and author. Sobol left behind three children: John, Eric and Diane as well as four grandchildren. A fourth child, Glen, died at age 23 in a car accident in 1983.

On July 11, 2012, Sobol died from gastric lymphoma at the age of 87.

Selected bibliography

Encyclopedia Brown series
The Encyclopedia Brown books, in order of publication (parentheses indicate numbers on original release cover art):

 Encyclopedia Brown, Boy Detective (1963, 1982 reissue )
 Encyclopedia Brown Strikes Again (1965, reissued as Encyclopedia Brown and the Case of the Secret Pitch)
 Encyclopedia Brown Finds the Clues (1966)
 Encyclopedia Brown Gets His Man (1967)
 Encyclopedia Brown Solves Them All (1968)
 Encyclopedia Brown Keeps the Peace (1969)
 Encyclopedia Brown Saves the Day (1970)
 Encyclopedia Brown Tracks Them Down (1971)
 Encyclopedia Brown Shows the Way (1972)
 Encyclopedia Brown Takes the Case (1973)
 Encyclopedia Brown Lends a Hand (1974, reissued as Encyclopedia Brown and the Case of the Exploding Plumbing and Other Mysteries)
 Encyclopedia Brown and the Case of the Dead Eagles (1975)
 Encyclopedia Brown and the Case of the Midnight Visitor (1977)
 Encyclopedia Brown Carries On (1980)
 Encyclopedia Brown Sets the Pace (1981)
 (15½) Encyclopedia Brown Takes the Cake (co-written with Glenn Andrews, 1982)
 (16) Encyclopedia Brown and the Case of the Mysterious Handprints (1985)
 (17) Encyclopedia Brown and the Case of the Treasure Hunt (1988)
 (18) Encyclopedia Brown and the Case of the Disgusting Sneakers (1990)
 (19) Encyclopedia Brown and the Case of the Two Spies (1995)
 (20) Encyclopedia Brown and the Case of Pablo's Nose (1996)
 (21) Encyclopedia Brown and the Case of the Sleeping Dog (1998)
 (22) Encyclopedia Brown and the Case of the Slippery Salamander (2000)
 (23) Encyclopedia Brown and the Case of the Jumping Frogs (2003)
 (24) Encyclopedia Brown Cracks the Case (2007)
 (25) Encyclopedia Brown, Super Sleuth (2009)
 (26) Encyclopedia Brown and the Case of the Secret UFOs (2010)
 (27) Encyclopedia Brown and the Case of the Carnival Crime (2011)
 (28) Encyclopedia Brown and the Case of the Soccer Scheme (2012)

Two-Minute Mysteries series
The Two-Minute Mysteries series, in order of publication:

 Two-Minute Mysteries (1969)
 More Two-Minute Mysteries (1971)
 Still More Two-Minute Mysteries (1975)

References

External links
 Sobol at publisher HarperCollins
 

1924 births
2012 deaths
American children's writers
United States Army personnel of World War II
American mystery writers
Edgar Award winners
Oberlin College alumni
United States Army Corps of Engineers personnel
United States Army soldiers
Novelists from Florida
Writers from New York City
American male novelists
20th-century American novelists
20th-century American male writers
Novelists from New York (state)